Florence City Schools is the public school district of the city of Florence, Alabama. As of the 2004–2005 school year it has some 4,188 students and 235 full-time teachers. Florence City Schools offers 14 Advanced Placement courses, 52 career/tech courses, 14 competitive sports with 61 teams, and education from the "cradle to career."

According to 2012 U.S. News Best High Schools, Florence City Schools was ranked #17 out of a total of 370 high schools in the state of Alabama placing them in the top 5% of Alabama schools.

Secondary schools

High schools

Grades 9-12
Florence High School/Florence Freshman Center
 Used to be Bradshaw High School until the merge with Coffee High School in 2004
 Notable Alumni include  Beniquez Brown, Braxton Garrett, and Erroll Thompson

Middle schools

Grades 7–8
Florence Middle School

Grades 5–6
Hibbett Middle School

Primary schools

Elementary schools
Forest Hills Elementary School
Harlan Elementary School
Weeden Elementary Schools

Preschools
Handy HeadStart. (The Handy Headstart program was officially removed as a part of the Florence City School System in October 2013 as part of the federal government shutdown and a lacking of federal funding. The program continues to operate, however.)

Board of Education
Board positions are on a 4-year election cycle.

2008: Ms. Vicky  Kirkman (District 1), Mr. Bill Jordan (District 2), Mrs. MaLeah Chaney (District 3), Thomas F Wissert (District 4), Mrs. Laura  Hardeman (District 5), Mr. Jim  Fisher (District 6)

2012: Ms. Vicky Kirkman (District 1), Mr. Bill Jordan (District 2), Mr. Bill Griffin (District 3), Mr. Bill Gullett (District 4), Mrs. Laura Hardeman (District 5), Mr. Brad Dethero, appointed (District 6)

2016: Ms. Vicky Kirkman (District 1), Mr. Bill Jordan (District 2), Mr. Bill Griffin (District 3), Mr. Bill Gullett (District 4), Mrs. Laura Hardeman (District 5), Mrs. Britton Watson (District 6)

References

External links

School districts in Alabama
Education in Florence, Alabama